Clara Louise Maass (June 28, 1876 – August 24, 1901) was an American nurse who died as a result of volunteering for medical experiments to study yellow fever.

Early life
Clara Maass was born in East Orange, New Jersey, to German immigrants Hedwig and Robert Maass.  She was the oldest of nine children in a devout Lutheran family. Clara's family was impoverished and to help alleviate the financial burden of one child on her family, she went to work as a "mother's helper" for a local woman while in elementary school. She did not generate any income, but was able to live and eat with her employer's family.

In 1895, she became one of the first graduates of Newark German Hospital's Christina Trefz Training School for Nurses.  By 1898, she had been promoted to head nurse at Newark German Hospital, where she was known for her hard work and dedication to her profession.

Army service
In April 1898, during the Spanish–American War, Maass volunteered as a contract nurse for the United States Army (the Army Nurse Corps did not yet exist).  She served with the Seventh U.S. Army Corps from October 1, 1898, to February 5, 1899, in Jacksonville, Florida; Savannah, Georgia; and Santiago, Cuba.  She was discharged in 1899, but volunteered again to serve with the Eighth U.S. Army Corps in the Philippines from November 1899 to mid-1900.

During her service with the military, she saw few battle injuries. Instead, most of her nursing duties came in providing medical aid to soldiers suffering from infectious diseases like typhoid, malaria, dengue and yellow fever.  She contracted dengue in Manila, and was sent home.

Yellow fever studies
Shortly after finishing her second assignment with the army, Maass returned to Cuba in October 1900 after being summoned by William Gorgas, who was working with the U.S. Army's Yellow Fever Commission.  The commission, headed by Major Walter Reed, was established during the post-war occupation of Cuba in order to investigate yellow fever, which was endemic in Cuba.  One of the commission's goals was to determine how the disease was spread: by mosquito bites or by contact with contaminated objects.

The commission recruited human subjects because they did not know of any animals that could contract yellow fever.  In the first recorded instance of informed consent in human experiments, volunteers were told that participation in the studies might cause their deaths.  As an incentive, volunteers were paid US$100 (approximately $ today), with an additional $100 if the volunteer became ill.

In March 1901, Maass volunteered to be bitten by a Culex fasciata mosquito (now called Aedes aegypti) that had been allowed to feed on yellow fever patients. By this time, the researchers were certain that mosquitoes were the route of transmission, but lacked the scientific evidence to prove it because some volunteers who were bitten remained healthy.  Maass continued to volunteer for experiments.

Death
On August 14, 1901, Maass allowed herself to be bitten by infected mosquitoes for the second time. Researchers were hoping to show that her earlier case of yellow fever was sufficient to immunize her against the disease. Unfortunately, this was not the case.  Maass once again became ill with yellow fever on August 18 and died on August 24. Her death roused public sentiment and put an end to yellow fever experiments on human beings.

Maass was buried in Colon Cemetery in Havana with military honors. Her body was moved to Fairmount Cemetery in Newark, New Jersey, on February 20, 1902.

Legacy

In 1951, the 50th anniversary of her death, Cuba issued a postage stamp in her honour.
On June 19, 1952, Newark German Hospital (which had since moved to Belleville, New Jersey) was renamed Clara Maass Memorial Hospital, and it is now known as Clara Maass Medical Center.
In 1976, the 100th anniversary of her birth, Maass was honored with a 13¢ United States commemorative stamp.
Also in 1976, the American Nurses Association inducted her into its Nursing Hall of Fame.
The Calendar of Saints of the Lutheran Church honors Maass and British nurse Florence Nightingale on August 13 as a "Renewer of Society."

See also
Unethical human experimentation in the United States

References

External links
American Nurses Association Hall of Fame retrieved 2010-04-26

1876 births
1901 deaths
Deaths from yellow fever
People from East Orange, New Jersey
Walter Reed
American Lutherans
People celebrated in the Lutheran liturgical calendar
American people of German descent
American nurses
American women nurses
People of the Spanish–American War
Female wartime nurses
Burials at Fairmount Cemetery (Newark, New Jersey)
Infectious disease deaths in Cuba
Human subject research in the United States